Diamond's was a department store chain headquartered in Phoenix, Arizona.
Originally named The Boston Store, it was founded in 1897 by Nathan and Issac Diamond, Jewish immigrants who had earlier begun a dry-goods mercantile in El Paso, it was renamed Diamond's in 1947 in honor of the store's 50th anniversary. Consisting of one store in Park Central Mall in downtown Phoenix, Diamond's had expanded to twelve stores throughout the Southwest when in 1984 then owner, Dayton-Hudson Corporation, sold the chain to Dillard's.

Locations 
The locations of the 12 former Diamond's department stores.
 Flagship Store, Washington Street at 2nd Street, Phoenix, AZ (opened 1897)
 Park Central Mall, Phoenix, AZ (opened 1957)
 Thomas Mall, Phoenix, AZ (opened 1963)
 Tri City Mall, Mesa, AZ (opened 1968)
 Metrocenter Mall, Phoenix, AZ (opened 1973)
 Park Place Mall, Tucson, AZ (opened 1974)
 Fashion Square Mall, Scottsdale, AZ (opened 1974)
 The Meadows, Las Vegas, NV (opened 1978)
 Paradise Valley Mall, Phoenix, AZ (opened  1979)
 Fiesta Mall, Mesa, AZ (opened 1980)
 Desert Sky Mall, Phoenix, AZ (opened 1981)
 Fashion Show Mall, Las Vegas, NV (opened 1981)
 Tucson Mall, Tucson, AZ (opened 1982)

References

External links
 Harold Diamond, A Pioneer Retailer

Companies based in Phoenix, Arizona
Defunct companies based in Arizona
Defunct department stores based in Arizona
Retail companies established in 1897
Retail companies disestablished in 1984
Target Corporation